Suzanne Azar (née Schmeck, born 1946) is a politician, aviator and former mayor of El Paso, Texas. Azar was the first woman to serve as mayor in El Paso. Azar lives in Central El Paso. She is also a flight instructor and owner of a fixed-base operator and flight school; and is a member of the women pilots' organization the Ninety-Nines. Azar has been inducted into the El Paso Women's Hall of Fame.

Biography 
Azar was born in Bay City, Michigan in 1946 and as a young person was a member of the Civil Air Patrol. She moved to El Paso in 1970 and attended the University of Texas at El Paso (UTEP).

Azar was sworn into office as mayor of El Paso in 1989. During her campaign, she was called a "cheerleader" by her opponent, and Azar turned the intended insult to "her advantage, campaigning with pom poms and calling herself an unabashed cheerleader for El Paso". She won the campaign for mayor with a 65% majority vote.

References

External links 
 Suzie Azar on her life experiences (video)

1946 births
Mayors of El Paso, Texas
Politicians from Bay City, Michigan
University of Texas at El Paso alumni
Living people
Women mayors of places in Texas
American women aviators
Aviators from Texas
American women flight instructors
American flight instructors
21st-century American women